The 1993 South African Grand Prix was a Formula One motor race held at Kyalami on 14 March 1993. The race, contested over 72 laps, was the first race of the 1993 FIA Formula One World Championship and was won from pole position by Alain Prost, driving a Williams-Renault, with Ayrton Senna second in a McLaren-Ford and Mark Blundell third in a Ligier-Renault.

This was the first time since 1974 that the first race of a season did not feature the defending Drivers' Champion in the field (in 1974, Jackie Stewart was missing as he had retired following the death of his teammate François Cevert in 1973). Defending 1992 champion Nigel Mansell had moved to race in CART for the season. Since there was no defending Drivers' Champion in the field this season, defending Constructors' Champion Williams could not use No. 1 on either of its cars. Therefore, this was the first race since the 1973 United States Grand Prix that number 0 was used.

The Swiss Sauber team made their Grand Prix debut and scored their first points with JJ Lehto's 5th-place finish.

Report
The season started off in Kyalami where Prost, in his first race with Williams, took pole ahead of Senna, Schumacher, Hill, Alesi and Lehto, impressing in Sauber's first Grand Prix. At the start, Prost was poor and Senna and Hill (who was already ahead of Schumacher) got ahead of him. Then, Hill spun in front of Prost and dropped well down the field, Prost being forced to back off and let Schumacher through to second. Senna led Schumacher, Prost, Lehto, Wendlinger and Alesi at the end of lap one.

Prost attacked Schumacher, took second on lap 13 and set off after Senna. Five laps later, he attacked into the first corner but Senna took the inside and defended. However, Senna could not do anything when Prost attacked on lap 25 with the inside line. He took the lead and motored off. Schumacher also passed Senna to take second soon after. Both of them pitted unlike Prost, but Senna was quicker and rejoined ahead.

Schumacher was in no mood to stay third and attacked Senna on lap 40. There was minor contact and Schumacher spun off into retirement. Patrese was third but he too spun off on lap 47, leaving Blundell's Ligier third and Fittipaldi's impressive Minardi in fourth. Prost won from Senna, Blundell, Fittipaldi, Lehto (who was lapped twice in early stages of the race) and Berger (he was out but was classified sixth).

Classification

Qualifying

Race

Championship standings after the race

Drivers' Championship standings

Constructors' Championship standings

References

South African Grand Prix
South African Grand Prix
Grand Prix
South African Grand Prix